Kraljevica Shipyard is a shipbuilder at Kraljevica, on the Adriatic coast of Croatia. The shipyard was founded in 1729 and is claimed to be the oldest continuously operational shipyard in the world.

The shipyard has been operating under the name DALMONT d.o.o. since 1992. The government of Croatia has repeatedly attempted to privatise the shipyard, most recently in November 2010. The company was forced into bankruptcy proceedings by the Croatian government in March 2012.

Vessels
The shipyard has produced a variety of commercial ships, military vessels, and superyachts.
In 2009, Kraljevica Shipyard constructed the JoyMe, a 49.9 metre yacht.
In 2010, the shipyard agreed to build two large trawlers for Russian clients.

References

External links
 Kraljevica Shipyard

Primorje-Gorski Kotar County
Shipbuilding companies of Croatia
1729 establishments in the Habsburg monarchy
18th-century establishments in Hungary
Croatian brands